Medbourne is a village and civil parish in the Harborough district, in the county of Leicestershire, England. The population of the civil parish at the 2011 census was 473.

Each year it competes with nearby Hallaton during the Bottle-kicking event on Easter Monday. It is believed that Medbourne, which lay on the Gartree Road, was a large market settlement at the time of Roman Britain.

The Village

Medbourne is a small, tranquil village just ten minutes from Market Harborough and fifteen minutes from Uppingham. The village has its own shop, known as Medbourne Village Stores and a pub called the Nevill Arms. The railway station closed as long ago as 1916. It is regarded as the most sought-after village to live within the Welland Valley.

The Sports & Social Club is on the Hallaton Road on the edge of the village and is home to the local football and cricket teams. Despite being in Leicestershire, Medbourne F.C. play in the premier division of the Northamptonshire Combination, which sits at the seventh level of the English non-league pyramid.

The name "Medbourne" means "Meadow Stream".

References

External links 

Medbourne Village Website
Medbourne Parish Walks
Illustrated details

Villages in Leicestershire
Civil parishes in Harborough District